The Bjelovar-Križevci County was a historic administrative subdivision of the Kingdom of Croatia-Slavonia. Croatia-Slavonia was an autonomous kingdom within the Lands of the Crown of Saint Stephen (Transleithania), the Hungarian part of the dual Austro-Hungarian Empire. Its territory is now in northern Croatia. Belovár and Kőrös are the Hungarian names for the cities Bjelovar and Križevci, respectively. The capital of the county was Bjelovar.

Geography
The Bjelovar-Križevci County shared borders with the Hungarian county of Somogy, and the Croatian-Slavonian counties of Virovitica, Požega, Varaždin, and Zagreb. The river Drava formed its northeastern border. Its area was 5048 km2 around 1910.

History

The territory of the Bjelovar-Križevci County was part of the Kingdom of Croatia when it entered a personal union with the Kingdom of Hungary in 1102, and with it became part of the Habsburg monarchy in 1526. Bjelovar-Križevci County was formed in 1886 from the former counties Bjelovar and Križevci. In 1920 by the Treaty of Trianon the county became part of the newly formed Kingdom of Serbs, Croats and Slovenes (later renamed to Yugoslavia). Since 1991, when Croatia became independent from Yugoslavia, the county has been part of Croatia.

Demographics
In 1900, the county had a population of 303,620 people and was composed of the following linguistic communities:

Total:

 Croatian: 225,451 (74.3%)
 Serbian: 44,654 (14.7%)
 Hungarian: 14,057 (4.6%)
 German: 4,218 (1.4%)
 Slovak: 156 (0.1%)
 Romanian: 2 (0.0%)
 Ruthenian: 27 (0.0%)
 Other or unknown: 15,055 (4.9%)

According to the census of 1900, the county was composed of the following religious communities:

Total:

 Roman Catholic: 254,062 (83.7%)
 Serbian Orthodox: 44,872 (14.8%)
 Jewish: 2,275 (0.7%)
 Calvinist: 1,115 (0.4%)
 Lutheran: 1,018 (0.3%)
 Greek Catholic: 255 (0.1%)
 Unitarian: 0 (0.0%)
 Other or unknown: 23 (0.0%)

In 1910, the county had a population of 332,592 people and was composed of the following linguistic communities:

Total:

 Croatian: 253,687 (76.28%)
 Serbian: 44,533 (13.39%)
 Hungarian: 14,224 (4.28%)
 German: 4,235 (1.27%)
 Slovak: 386 (0.12%)
 Ruthenian: 281 (0.08%)
 Romanian: 1 (0.0%)
 Other or unknown: 15,245 (4.58%)

According to the census of 1910, the county was composed of the following religious communities:

Total:

 Roman Catholic: 282,450 (84.92%)
 Serbian Orthodox: 44,658 (13.43%)
 Jewish: 2,406 (0.72%)
 Lutheran: 1,224 (0.37%)
 Calvinist: 1,210 (0.36%)
 Greek Catholic: 635 (0.19%)
 Unitarian: 0 (0.0%)
 Other or unknown: 9 (0.0%)

Subdivisions
In the early 20th century, the subdivisions of Belovár-Kőrös county were:

See also

 Bjelovar-Bilogora and Koprivnica-Križevci counties of Croatia

References 

 
1920 disestablishments
Former counties of Croatia
Counties in the Kingdom of Hungary
States and territories established in the 12th century
Križevci